Calcium-binding protein 39-like is a protein that in humans is encoded by the CAB39L gene.

References

External links

Further reading